List of presidents of the Lagting since 1945, the one chamber of the Parliament of Norway from 1945 to 2009, when the chamber was discontinued.

Footnotes

Politics of Norway
Lagting, presidents
Norway, Lagting